The Imperial Dictionary may be:
The Imperial Dictionary of the English Language (Ogilvie, 1855; Annandale, 1882), or Webster's Imperial Dictionary based on it
The Kangxi Dictionary of Chinese (17th century)
 Imperial Dictionary of Universal Biography (1863)